Laguna Hills (Laguna, Spanish for "Lagoon") is a city in southern Orange County, California, United States. Its name refers to its proximity to Laguna Canyon and the much older Laguna Beach. Other newer cities nearby—Laguna Niguel and Laguna Woods—are similarly named.

Geography

History
Laguna Hills is built on one of the major land grants developed during the rancho era. Following Mexico's independence from Spain in 1821, those who had served in the government or who had friends in authority, were given vast lands for cattle grazing. Rancho Lomas de Santiago, Rancho San Joaquin, and Rancho Niguel covered much of the western portion of the Saddleback Valley. Don Juan Avila was granted the 13,000-acre Rancho Niguel on which Laguna Hills is located.

Moulton and his partner, Jean Piedra Daguerre, used the ranch to raise sheep and cattle. The Moulton Ranch was eventually subdivided in the early 1960s, and part of the division became today's Laguna Hills.

Incorporation efforts began in 1987 and on March 5, 1991, 86% of the residents voted in favor of forming the City of Laguna Hills. On December 20, 1991, Laguna Hills officially became a City. Subsequent annexations have included the North Laguna Hills (1996) and the "Westside Annexation" (2000) areas. The latter included  of residential land, including the Aliso Viejo Community Association's Sheep Hills Park.

In 2004, Laguna Hills' City Hall was moved to an existing office building at 24035 El Toro Road, which was bought and renovated by the city. The city also rents out commercial space in the building, providing the city with a positive net income.

Demographics

2010
The 2010 United States Census reported that Laguna Hills had a population of 30,344. The racial makeup of Laguna Hills was 22,045 (72.7%) White (61.7% Non-Hispanic White), 420 (1.4%) African American, 101 (0.3%) Native American, 3,829 (12.6%) Asian, 58 (0.2%) Pacific Islander, 2,470 (8.1%) from other races, and 1,421 (4.7%) from two or more races. Hispanic or Latino of any race were 6,242 persons (20.6%).

The Census reported that 29,975 people (98.8% of the population) lived in households, 233 (0.8%) lived in non-institutionalized group quarters, and 136 (0.4%) were institutionalized.

There were 10,469 households, of which 3,637 (34.7%) had children under the age of 18 living in them, 6,278 (60.0%) were opposite-sex married couples living together, 983 (9.4%) had a female householder with no husband present, 472 (4.5%) had a male householder with no wife present. There were 445 (4.3%) unmarried opposite-sex partnerships, and 101 (1.0%) same-sex married couples or partnerships. 2,041 households (19.5%) were made up of individuals, and 822 (7.9%) had someone living alone who was 65 years of age or older. The average household size was 2.86. There were 7,733 families (73.9% of all households); the average family size was 3.25.

6,762 people (22.3%) were under the age of 18; 2,617 people (8.6%) aged 18 to 24; 7,638 people (25.2%) aged 25 to 44; 9,437 people (31.1%) aged 45 to 64; and 3,890 people (12.8%) who were 65 years of age or older. The median age was 40.8 years. For every 100 females, there were 95.5 males. For every 100 females age 18 and over, there were 93.6 males.

The homeowner vacancy rate was 1.4%; the rental vacancy rate was 11.2%.  22,307 people (73.5% of the population) lived in owner-occupied housing units and 7,668 people (25.3%) lived in rental housing units.

2000

At the 2000 census, there were 31,178 people, 10,895 households and 7,942 families residing in the city. The racial makeup of the city was 76.83% White, 1.38% African American, 0.44% Native American, 10.20% Asian, 0.15% Pacific Islander, 7.19% from other races, and 3.81% from two or more races. Hispanic or Latino of any race were 16.40% of the population.

There were 10,895 households, of which 37.5% had children under the age of 18 living with them, 61.0% were married couples living together, 8.5% had a female householder with no husband present, and 27.1% were non-families. 21.6% of all households were made up of individuals, and 10.0% had someone living alone who was 65 years of age or older. The average household size was 2.82 and the average family size was 3.29.

26.2% of the population were under the age of 18, 7.3% from 18 to 24, 28.8% from 25 to 44, 25.4% from 45 to 64, and 12.1% who were 65 years of age or older. The median age was 38 years. For every 100 females, there were 92.6 males. For every 100 females age 18 and over, there were 89.0 males.

According to a 2007 estimate, the median household income was $89,781 and the median family income was $102,191. Males had a median income of $59,144 versus $38,761 for females. The per capita income for the city was $36,133.  About 3.6% of families and 5.0% of the population were below the poverty line, including 5.3% of those under age 18 and 5.1% of those age 65 or over.

Government
{| class="wikitable"  style="float:right; margin:1em; font-size:95%;"
|+ Laguna Hills city vote by party in presidential elections|- style="background:lightgrey;"
! Year
! Democratic
! Republican
! Third Parties
|-
|align="center" |2020
|align="center" |51.98% 9,129
|align="center" |46.13% 8,102
|align="center" |1.90% 333
|-
|align="center" |2016
|align="center" |45.95% 6,647
|align="center" |47.31% 6,844
|align="center" |6.75% 976
|-
|align="center" |2012
|align="center" |40.67% 5,755
|align="center" |57.12% 8,083
|align="center" |2.21% 313
|-
|align="center" |2008
|align="center" |44.69% 6,557
|align="center" |53.25% 7,812
|align="center" |2.06% 302
|-
|align="center" |2004
|align="center" |36.12% 5,019
|align="center" |62.68% 8,711
|align="center" |1.20% 167
|-
|align="center" |2000
|align="center" |35.90% 4,328
|align="center" |60.37% 7,278
|align="center" |3.73% 449
|-
|align="center" |1996
|align="center" |33.87% 3,784
|align="center" |56.63% 6,326
|align="center" |9.50% 1,061
|-
|align="center" |1992
|align="center" |26.69% 2,778
|align="center" |48.92%' 5,091|align="center" |24.39% 2,538|}

Laguna Hills is historically a Republican stronghold in presidential elections. In 2020, however, Joe Biden became the first Democratic presidential nominee to win the city since its incorporation.

According to the California Secretary of State, as of February 10, 2019, Laguna Hills has 18,217 registered voters. Of those, 7,002 (38.44%) are registered Republicans, 5,261 (28.88%) are registered Democrats, and 5,143 (28.23%) have no political party preference/are independents.

The Laguna Hills Civic Center was an existing office building at 24035 El Toro Road – near the Laguna Hills Mall – which was bought and totally renovated by the city. The city moved its City Hall there in 2004, but also rents out space in the building on a commercial basis, providing the city with a positive net income on the building.

Laguna Hills is home to one of the California DMV field offices, where driving tests and other services are administered. The office serves much of south Orange County as the only other location in the region is in San Clemente.

Emergency services
Fire protection in Laguna Hills is provided by the Orange County Fire Authority with ambulance service by Care Ambulance Service. There is also the MemorialCare Saddleback Medical Center, a hospital equipped with a full emergency room. Law enforcement is provided by the Orange County Sheriff's Department.

Economy
Centers of economic activity include:
 Laguna Hills Mall, closed in 2018, to be razed and redeveloped into the Five Lagunas mixed-use development
 El Toro Road at the I-5 freeway, an area busy with vehicular traffic and long-distance travel stops, thus being heavily populated with strip malls and fast-food restaurants.

Education
Laguna Hills is served by the Saddleback Valley Unified School District. Laguna Hills students attend a variety of high performing elementary schools; Lomarena Elementary School, San Joaquin Elementary School and Valencia Elementary School. Laguna Hills middle schools are La Paz Intermediate School and Los Alisos Intermediate School in neighboring Mission Viejo. The city has its own high school, Laguna Hills High School, the smallest school in the district built in 1978 and one of the smallest in south Orange County with fewer than 1,700 students. LHHS has been named a National Blue Ribbon School and a California Distinguished School on multiple occasions.

Notable people

 Shane Bieber, major league pitcher for the Cleveland Indians, MVP of the 2019 Major League Baseball All-Star Game
 Aloe Blacc, singer and songwriter best known for his single I Need A Dollar
 Chad Carvin (1974), Olympic medalist swimmer
 Phil Collen (current resident), guitarist for the band Def Leppard
 Russ Conway, actor
 Fieldy (current resident), bass guitarist for the band Korn
 Steve Gibson, computer programmer and co-host of Security Now Jenna Haze (1982), pornographic actress
 Mike Hopkins, Syracuse Orange men's basketball assistant coach and former player
 Jeff Keane, Family Circus cartoonist
Tyler Krieger (1994), baseball player in the Cleveland Indians organization
 John Lamb, major league pitcher for the Cincinnati Reds
 Michael Novales  (1985), former US figure skating competitor, currently skating for Philippine Skating Union
 Carson Palmer (1998), NFL quarterback and Heisman Trophy winner for the University of Southern California
 Kaitlin Sandeno (1983), Olympic medalist swimmer
 George Sixta, cartoonist of the syndicated Rivets'' (1953–1985)
 Reece Ushijima (2003), Japanese-American racing driver
 Zacky Vengeance (current resident), rhythm guitarist for the band Avenged Sevenfold

See also 

 Laguna Hills Technology Branch Library

References

External links

Congressman John Campbell
State Senator Mimi Walters
State Assemblywoman Diane Harkey

 
1991 establishments in California
Cities in Orange County, California
Incorporated cities and towns in California
Populated places established in 1991
San Joaquin Hills